The vice-president of the Council of State is the de facto presiding officer of the Council of State. The monarch serves as the ex officio president of the Council of State but in reality seldom chairs meetings, in his absence, the vice-president serves as pro tempore chair of those meetings. The vice-president is also in charge of the council's organisation and administrative duties. The Constitution of the Netherlands stipulates that if the royal house were to become extinct the vice-president will become the acting head of state. Like the other members of the Council of State the vice president is appointed by the monarch upon nomination by the minister of the interior and kingdom relations. The service of the vice-president is a life tenure appointment but is required by law to enter a mandatory retirement at the age of 70. Alternatively, an early retirement or a forced termination of his tenure can be given by the monarch in a royal decree.

The current vice-president of the Council of State is Thom de Graaf.

List of vice-presidents

See also
 Council of State (Netherlands)
 Monarchy of the Netherlands

References